Never Mind the Ballots (occasionally called Never Mind the Ballots... Here's the Rest of Your Life by fans and distributors) is the second studio album by anarchist punk band Chumbawamba. Most of the songs center on lying politicians and their search for more voter control. It was originally released on cassette and LP, then re-released in the 1990s as half of the Chumbawamba compilation CD First 2, which is a combination of their first two LP albums released on a single CD.

Composition
The album's lyrics have been noted for criticizing all sides of the United Kingdom's political parties, particularly in the case of the song "The Candidates Find Common Ground."

Release 
The album was initially released in 1987. It was reportedly "rush-released" so that it would be available in time for the 1987 United Kingdom general election. In 1991, it was reissued on CD along with Pictures of Starving Children Sell Records; the pair was released under the name First 2.

The album was rereleased digitally on May 4, 2012, by Westpark Music.

Impact

Chart performance 
The album attained a peak of number two on the UK Indie chart.

Legacy 
The album was retrospectively awarded a rating of four stars out of five in The Encyclopedia of Popular Music.

Track listing 
Adapted from the record's rerelease via Bandcamp.
 "Always Tell the Voter What the Voter Wants to Hear" – 2:51
 "Come on Baby (Let's Do the Revolution)" – 1:39
 "The Wasteland" – 4:23
 "Today's Sermon" – 2:28
 "Ah-Men" – 2:29
 "Mr. Heseltine Meets His Public" – 3:51
 "The Candidates Find Common Ground" – 4:29
 "Here's the Rest of Your Life" – 13:22

Personnel 
 Lou Watts – vocals, guitar
 Harry Hamer – drums, percussion, vocals
 Mavis Dillon – bass guitar, trumpet, vocals
 Alice Nutter – vocals
 Danbert Nobacon – vocals
 Boff Whalley – guitar, vocals
 Dunstan Bruce – vocals

Additional personnel

 Simon "Commonknowledge" Lanzon – keyboards, vocals
 Neil Ferguson – engineer, keyboards
 Patrick Gordon – engineer

References

Chumbawamba albums
1987 albums
Agit-Prop Records albums